American Stonehenge may refer to:

Places
 America's Stonehenge, an archaeological site in Salem, New Hampshire
 Amazon Stonehenge, an archaeological site in northern Brazil
 Tiwanaku, a Pre-Columbian archaeological site in western Bolivia
 Georgia Guidestones, a contemporary megalith in Elbert County, Georgia

Other
 American Stonehenge (album), by Robin Williamson and his Merry Band